Bianji (fl. 7th century) was a Buddhist monk who lived in the Tang Dynasty. He was also the translator and author of Great Tang Records on the Western Regions. Little is known about his life, apart from that he translated several Buddhist scriptures and sutras. He was executed by Emperor Taizong for having an illicit affair with the emperor's daughter Princess Gaoyang.

References 
 Zhang Xiuping et al. (1993). 100 Books That Influenced China: Da Tang Xiyu Ji. Nanning: Guangxi Renmin Press. . p. 392-398.

Chinese travel writers
Tang dynasty Buddhist monks
7th-century deaths
649 deaths
Tang dynasty writers
Executed Tang dynasty people
Year of birth unknown
7th-century executions by the Tang dynasty
People executed by cutting in half
Medieval travel writers
Chinese Buddhist monks
Tang dynasty Buddhists
7th-century Buddhists